Selishcha is a rural locality (a village) in Novlenskoye Rural Settlement, Vologodsky District, Vologda Oblast, Russia. The population was 28 as of 2002.

Geography 
Selishcha is located 81 km northwest of Vologda (the district's administrative centre) by road. Stepanovo is the nearest rural locality.

References 

Rural localities in Vologodsky District